Dolopia is a mountainous region of Greece, located north of Aetolia.

Geography
Dolopia was located between Epirus and Thessaly, eventually absorbed into the latter. It was a mountainous district in the southwestern corner of Thessaly, lying between Mount Tymphrestus, a branch of Pindus, on the one side, and Mount Othrys on the other. The Dolopes were, like the Magnetes, an ancient Hellenic people, and members of the Amphictyonic League. They are mentioned by Homer as included in Phthia, but were governed by a subordinate chieftain of their own. Though nominally belonging to Thessaly, they seem practically to have been independent: and their country was at a later period a constant subject of contention between the Aetolians and the kings of Macedonia. The only place in Dolopia of the slightest importance was Ctimene. Other of their cities were, Angeia and Dolopeis, close to lake Xynius.

Mythology and history

The Dolopes were considered Thessalians, or sometimes Aetolians. There was also a son of the god Hermes named Dolops, and two persons in the Iliad. One was the son of Lampus, an elder Trojan and son of king Laomedon (who was killed by Menelaus). Another Dolops was the son of Clytius, Clytides, who was killed by Hector, and a third one was the father of Iphimachus that took care of Philoctetes.

Dolopians were either under Thessalian rule, or autonomous and members of the Amphictyonic league. In 480 BC they joined the Persian marching army. In 420 BC they warred against Heraclea in Trachis in alliance with Thessalians and Aenianians. In the 4th century BC they allied themselves with the Corinthian league under Philip II.

List of Dolopians

Phoenix, the son of Amyntor, king whose sight was restored by the centaur Chiron

See also
Eurytanes
Acarnania
List of traditional Greek place names
Aetolia

References

Sources
History of Ktimenon
Dolopes, in Greek

External links

 
Historical regions in Greece
Ancient Greek geography
Geography of ancient Thessaly